South Carlsbad State Beach (which includes South Ponto) is a public beach located in Carlsbad, California.

Known for being a place for swimming, surfing, skin diving, fishing, and picnicking, the campground, which is led by the stairway from the beach, is very popular during the summer.

This beach is located immediately south of Carlsbad State Beach.

See also
List of beaches in California
List of California state parks

References

External links
 official South Carlsbad State Beach website

Beaches of Southern California
Parks in San Diego County, California
California State Beaches
Beaches of San Diego County, California
Carlsbad, California